China Care Foundation is a nonprofit organization that provides medical, social and educational programs for orphans with disabilities in China and gives college and high school students the opportunity to give back by fundraising and volunteering.

History 

China Care Foundation was founded by Matt Dalio in 2000 when he was 16 years old.  Dalio, who grew up in Connecticut, spent a year in China when he was 11 years old and returned five years later to personally witness the conditions of orphans with special needs.  He returned home and founded China Care Foundation. The organization provides medical care to special needs children to give them a chance for a brighter future.

See also 

List of non-governmental organizations in the People's Republic of China

References

External links 
The Official China Care Website
Article about Dalio and China Care Foundation in Family Circle magazine
Article about Dalio and China Care Foundation in People magazine

Charities based in Connecticut
Foreign charities operating in China